The Coast Range ecoregion is a Level III ecoregion designated by the Environmental Protection Agency (EPA) in the U.S. states of Washington, Oregon, and California. It stretches along the Pacific Coast from the tip of the Olympic Peninsula in the north to the San Francisco Bay in the south, including Grays Harbor, Willapa Bay, and the Long Beach Peninsula in Washington, the entire length of the Oregon Coast, and the Northern California Coast. Named for the Coast Range mountains, it encompasses the lower elevations of the Olympic Mountains, the Oregon Coast Range, the Californian North Coast Ranges, and surrounding lowlands.

The low mountains of the ecoregion are covered by highly productive, rain-drenched evergreen forests that are home to the three tallest conifer species in the world: Coast redwood, Coast Douglas-fir, and Sitka spruce. Historically, Sitka spruce forests dominated the fog-shrouded coast, while a mosaic of western redcedar, western hemlock, and seral Douglas-fir blanketed the inland areas. Today, Douglas-fir plantations are prevalent on the intensively logged and managed landscape. Lithology influences land management strategies; slopes underlain by sedimentary rock are more susceptible to failure following clearcutting and road building than those underlain by volcanic rock.

The Coast Range ecoregion has been subdivided into fifteen Level IV ecoregions.

Level IV ecoregions

Coastal Lowlands (1a)
The Coastal Lowlands ecoregion contains beaches, sand dunes and spits, and low marine terraces below  elevation. Characteristic features include wet forests, shallow freshwater lakes, estuarine marshes, and low-gradient, meandering tannic streams and rivers. Residential, commercial, and recreational developments are expanding in the coastal corridor. Many wetlands in the floodplains of the region's streams have been drained and converted into pastures for dairy farms, and associated stream degradation has occurred. Mature forests in the region are dominated by a canopy of Sitka spruce, western hemlock, and Douglas-fir, with salal, sword fern, vine maple, and Oregon grape in the shrub layer. The riparian zone supports red alder, western redcedar, and bigleaf maple with an understory of salmonberry; California bay-laurel is common in the south. Estuaries and coastal wetlands may feature Baltic rush, Lyngby's sedge, tufted hairgrass, Pacific silverleaf, and seaside arrowgrass with shore pine, sweet gale, and Hooker's willow. Stabilized dunes support shore pine over salal, rhododendron, and evergreen blueberry, with dune wildrye, Chilean strawberry, and dune bentgrass. Soil textures range from silty clay loam to sandy loam. Public lands include the Grays Harbor, Willapa, Nestucca Bay, Siletz Bay, and Bandon Marsh National Wildlife Refuges, the Oregon Dunes National Recreation Area, and numerous state parks.

Coastal Uplands (1b)
The Coastal Uplands ecoregion includes the headlands, high marine terraces, hills, and low mountains surrounding the Coastal Lowlands, with medium to high gradient tannic streams. Elevation varies from 400 to 2500 feet (120 to 760 m). The climate is marine-influenced with an extended winter rainy season and minimal seasonal temperature extremes. Abundant fog during the summer dry season reduces vegetation moisture stress. The Uplands region roughly corresponds with the historic distribution of Sitka spruce. After extensive logging, most of the Sitka spruce is gone, and today the forests are dominated by Douglas-fir and western hemlock, with a shrub layer of salal, sword fern, vine maple, Oregon grape, rhododendron, and evergreen blueberry. Wetter slopes and riparian areas feature red alder, bigleaf maple, and western redcedar, with a salmonberry and currant understory. The headlands are covered by grasslands. Public lands include the Drift Creek Wilderness, the Siuslaw National Forest, and the Lewis and Clark and Cape Meares national wildlife refuges. California has not been mapped yet.

Low Olympics (1c)
The Low Olympics ecoregion contains foothills and lower mountains of the Olympic Range, with U-shaped valleys and high gradient streams. Higher areas were glaciated. Copious precipitation (up to  a year) supports a lush, epiphyte-rich rainforest of western hemlock, western red cedar, and Douglas-fir, with Pacific silver fir at higher elevations. Riparian zones support red alder and bigleaf maple forests. Much of the region is in the third rotation of logging, including land within the Olympic National Forest. However, a portion of the region lies within Olympic National Park and contains ancient forests with extremely high biomass. The higher elevations of the Olympic Mountains to the east are designated as part of the North Cascades ecoregion.

Volcanics (1d)
The Volcanics ecoregion consists of steeply sloping mountains and capes underlain by fractured basaltic rocks. Elevation generally varies from 600 to 4100 feet (180 to 1250 m), although in some places the volcanic rock extends down to sea level. The region is marked by columnar and pillow basalt outcrops. Its mountains may have been offshore seamounts engulfed by continental sediments about 200 million years ago. High gradient, cascading streams and rivers occur, and the basaltic substrate preserves summer flows that are more consistent than streams on the sedimentary rocks in surrounding ecoregions. The streams still support runs of spring chinook salmon and summer steelhead. The region's Douglas-fir plantations are heavily logged. Mature forests consist of Douglas-fir, western hemlock, salal, sword fern, vine maple, Oregon grape, and rhododendron. Wetter slopes and riparian areas may support western redcedar, bigleaf maple, red alder, salmonberry, and oxalis. Grassy coastal headlands and mountaintop balds feature Roemer's fescue, thin bentgrass, California oatgrass, and diverse forbs. California has not been mapped yet.

Outwash (1e)
The Outwash ecoregion is a gently sloping fan of glacial outwash material that forms a series of undulating terraces and plateaus. Elevation varies from 20 to 1000 feet (6 to 300 m). The region lies outside the zone of marine influence, and its medium gradient streams and rivers have lower summer flow than most other parts of the Coast Range. Mature forest types include Douglas-fir, western hemlock, red alder, bigleaf maple, and western red cedar, but today the region is largely dominated by industrial timber plantations. It is the smallest of the Coast Range subregions, covering  in Grays Harbor County north of Aberdeen, Washington.

Willapa Hills (1f)
The Willapa Hills ecoregion (named for the Willapa Hills) consists of low, rolling hills and low, gently sloping mountains with medium gradient streams and rivers. This region has a lower drainage density than other upland areas in the Coast Range. Logging is relatively easy and less expensive in this accessible terrain, and industrial timberland has almost completely replaced the historic forests. When disturbed, the silt- and clay-textured soils are easily eroded, thereby degrading stream quality. The vegetation consists of Douglas-fir and western hemlock forests, with sword fern, vine maple, salal, Oregon grape, and rhododendron shrub layer. Wetter slopes and riparian areas support red alder, western redcedar, bigleaf maple, salmonberry, and oxalis. Large herds of Roosevelt elk winter in the region.

Mid-Coastal Sedimentary (1g)
The mountainous Mid-Coastal Sedimentary ecoregion lies outside of the coastal fog zone and is typically underlain by massive beds of sandstone and siltstone. Elevation varies from 300 to 3000 feet (90 to 900 m). The region is more rugged than the geologically similar Willapa Hills. Its Douglas-fir forests are intensively managed for logging, and the slopes are prone to failure when disturbed, particularly south of the Siuslaw River. Stream sedimentation is higher than in the Volcanics ecoregion. The mature forest consists of Douglas-fir and western hemlock, with salal, sword fern, vine maple, Oregon grape, and rhododendron; tanoak may be found on drier slopes to the south. Wetter slopes and riparian areas support bigleaf maple, western redcedar, grand fir, red alder, salmonberry, and oxalis, with California bay-laurel in the south. This is the largest of the Coast Range subregions, covering  in the Central and Southern Oregon Coast Range.

Southern Oregon Coastal Mountains (1h)
The Southern Oregon Coastal Mountains ecoregion is a geologically and botanically diverse ecoregion that is a transition zone between the Coast Range and the Siskiyou Mountains, which form part of the Klamath Mountains ecoregion to the east. Distributions of northern and southern vegetation blend together here and species diversity is high. Douglas-fir, western hemlock, tanoak, Port Orford cedar, and western redcedar are present, along with salal, sword fern, vine maple, Oregon grape, rhododendron, California bay-laurel, bigleaf maple, grand fir, red alder, salmonberry, and oxalis. It includes Grassy Knob Wilderness within the Siskiyou National Forest.

Redwood Zone (1i)
The low mountains of the Redwood Zone ecoregion lie entirely within the coastal fog zone. Elevation varies from 50 to 1800 feet (15 to 550 m). Historically, unbroken redwood forests moderated the local climate by trapping the coastal fog and producing shade. Remnants of unlogged redwood forest still survive east of Brookings, Oregon. Today, the region is characteristically covered by a mixed forest of coast redwood and Douglas-fir, with a shrub layer of vine maple, rhododendron, sword fern, and oxalis. Larger sections in northwestern California have not been mapped yet.

Gallery

Flora

Fauna

Landscapes

See also
 Coast Range (disambiguation)
 Ecoregions defined by the EPA and the Commission for Environmental Cooperation:
 List of ecoregions in North America (CEC)
 List of ecoregions in the United States (EPA)
 List of ecoregions in Oregon
 The conservation group World Wildlife Fund maintains an alternate classification system:
 List of ecoregions (WWF)
 List of ecoregions in the United States (WWF)

References

Ecoregions of the United States
Ecoregions of California
Ecoregions of Oregon
Regions of Washington (state)

Oregon Coast Range
 
 
Pacific temperate rainforests
Plant communities of the West Coast of the United States
Nearctic ecoregions